Miltochrista plumbilineata is a moth of the family Erebidae. It was described by George Hampson in 1900. It is found on Sulawesi in Indonesia.

References

 

plumbilineata
Moths described in 1900
Moths of Indonesia